A list of the Famous Studios theatrical cartoons featuring Casper the Friendly Ghost.

Filmography

Home media
Numerous Casper cartoons were released on home video by Universal Studios (via MCA Inc.). In 2011, Shout! Factory released a DVD set titled Casper the Friendly Ghost: The Complete Collection - 1945-1963 which contains The Friendly Ghost, There's Good Boos To-Night, A Haunting We Will Go, all 55 theatrical cartoons, and all 26 episodes of The New Casper Cartoon Show.

The 2D full screen version of Boo Moon was later reissued as the home media stand-alone reissue on VHS and Laserdisc released in the 1990s and distributed by MCA Universal Home Video. Released on VHS along with Gandy Goose and Sourpuss in Dingbat Land, standalone HarveyToon reissue of the short Crazy Town, and the Harvey Films reissue of The Seapreme Court featuring Little Audrey by United American Video.

See also 
 List of ghost films
 Casper the Friendly Ghost in film
 Homer the Happy Ghost
 Timmy the Timid Ghost

References

External links
 Harvey Entertainment
 Don Markstein's Toonopedia

Film series introduced in 1945
Famous Studios series and characters
Television series by U.M. & M. TV Corporation

Lists of animated films by character